is a Japanese former cyclist. He competed at the 1984 Summer Olympics and the 1988 Summer Olympics and 1986 Asian Games.

References

External links
 

1964 births
Living people
Japanese male cyclists
Olympic cyclists of Japan
Cyclists at the 1984 Summer Olympics
Cyclists at the 1988 Summer Olympics
People from Kōriyama
Asian Games medalists in cycling
Cyclists at the 1986 Asian Games
Medalists at the 1986 Asian Games
Asian Games gold medalists for Japan
Sportspeople from Fukushima Prefecture